Fusi may refer to the following people:
Given name
Fusi Mazibuko (born 1980), South African basketball player

Surname
Furio Fusi (born 1947), Italian sprinter
Juan Pablo Fusi (born 1945), Spanish historian
Luca Fusi (born 1963), Italian football player
Marco Fusi (clarinet player) (born 1972), Italian clarinetist and composer
Marco Fusi (violinist, violist), Italian violinist, violist and viola d’amore player.
Odo Fusi Pecci (1920–2016), Italian prelate of the Roman Catholic Church

Italian-language surnames